The Talares were a Molossian people of ancient Epirus, extinct in the time of Strabo. Their capital was probably Oxyneia.

References

Ancient tribes in Epirus
Greek tribes